Reb Wickersham (born January 11, 1934) is an American former professional stock car racing driver. He was a driver in the NASCAR Grand National Series from 1960 to 1965.

References

1934 births
Living people
Racing drivers from Florida
NASCAR drivers